Day Million is a collection of science fiction short stories by American writer Frederik Pohl, published in June 1970.

Contents

 "Day Million" (1966)
 "The Deadly Mission of Phineas Snodgrass" (1962)
 "The Day the Martians Came" (1967)
 "Schematic Man" (1968)
 "Small Lords" (1956)
 "Making Love" (1966)
 "Way Up Yonder" (1959)
 "Speed Trap" (1967)
 "It's a Young World" (1941)
 "Under Two Moons" (1965)

Plot summaries
The title story, "Day Million", details the romantic affair between two people, referred to as Don and Dora (shortened versions of the names of both) in the millionth day CE, which falls late in the year 2737, although the author alternately describes it as being about a thousand years in the future. The text addresses the reader directly, subverting expectations by revealing that Dora is genetically male but was made female shortly after conception because genetic analysis showed that she would prefer that outcome.  Don is described as handsome and bronzed, but is revealed to be a partial cyborg who wears a coppery radiation shield over his entire body, to protect him while helping to pilot a starship.  Dora for her part is semi-aquatic, having gills.  The two have a marriage ceremony and then part forever, having exchanged personality recordings.  Through these they can experience sex with each other and with any number of other virtual lovers.  The reader is addressed as a conservative man who is repelled by the concepts presented, while enjoying the fruits of progress in the 1960s.  

In the "Schematic Man" a man's life is transcribed into a computer to the point where he begins to believe that he is living within the machine, and "Making Love", in which population control is effected by providing everybody with simulated lovers indistinguishable from the real thing.

In contrast, "Under Two Moons" combines a parody of the John Carter stories by Edgar Rice Burroughs, with a hero cast as a space-traveling secret agent in the style of James Bond.

"The Day the Martians Came" is a short piece about men in a bar making up jokes about the newly discovered Martians, who are pathetic primitive beings.  All are re-workings of old racial jokes.  Somebody suggests that discovering the Martians won't matter to anybody, but the black bartender responds that it might matter a lot to people like him.

"The Deadly Mission of P. Snodgrass" is a time-travel story in which the protagonist gives modern medicine and technology to the Romans.  The resultant population explosion, extrapolated to the 20th century, results in the entire mass of the planet Earth consisting of human bodies.  It was originally published as humorous essay on the "Editor's Page" of Galaxy Science Fiction (June 1962).

External links

1971 short story collections
Short story collections by Frederik Pohl
Ballantine Books books
1970s science fiction works